Shafirul Azmi bin Suhaimi  Jawi شافيرول عزمي سوهايمي (born May 4, 1980) is a Malaysian citizen born in Sabah. He is one of the famous contemporary dance choreographers in the country. The basis of his dance moves was greatly influenced by the martial arts called Silat, a gesture of Sabah and Sarawak traditions that made his choreography very unique and interesting. In addition, he has often adopted site-specific, post-modern ideologies in his work.

Biography
He is a native of Kampung Contoh Kuala Petagas, Putatan, Sabah. The village is located near the town's airport and is near downstream of the Petagas River, which joint to the sea. It is also located between the Gorongon Beach and Vor Hill. He is the second of four siblings due to the marriage of Suhaimi Magi and Kamsia Mohd Noor. His father, Suhaimi Magi is from the Kampung Angan-Angan, Chinta Mata at Tenom district, while his mother, Kamsia Binti Mohd Noor comes from Kampung Buang Sayang, Papar. Both his parents are Sabah Bumiputeras because they were born in Sabah before the  North Borneo Self-government Day.

Education
In 1987, he attended Menteng 1 Jakarta Primary School in Indonesia. It is a legendary school that once housed the statue of former US President Barack Obama. In 1988 he went to Sabah, Malaysia to enter grades 2 through 6 at Tanjung Aru Primary School. In 1993-1997 he attended the Sabah High School. Upon graduating from the Malaysian Certificate of Education. in 1997, he traveled to Peninsular Malaysia to gain a deeper knowledge in the arts and culture. Finally with determination to succeed, in 2010 he earned a Bachelor of Dance with Honours (Choreography) at the National Academy of Arts, Culture and Heritage (ASWARA). Now he continuous studies Master of Social Science Political Science in National University of Malaysia.

Occupation
career based on years

Published works
He has been involved in many contemporary performances including Gerak Angin (Sutra Dance Theatre), Jamming The Box (Nyoba Kan and The Actors Studio), Curfew (Five Arts Center), Spring In Kuala Lumpur (Japan Foundation), AWAS (ASWARA) and The Light Show (Annexe Central Market). His musical work includes Ronggeng Rokiah, ANTARA, P. Ramlee, Kasih Menanti and Tun Abdul Razak at Istana Budaya, and TUNKU at KLPac. His own choreographic works are IBN, Let's Swim, Kabur, Tabung Uji, Niaki, Pipit, Hari+Hari, Escape, Typhoon, Transporter, Shakti, Tapak 4 and Cik Mah. He is always looking for unusual ideas for traditional-based art works, and favours productions with a collaborative element. He also did a research on the dance of the Malay Cocos in Tawau. He also did some commercial work for television programme.

Awards
Anugerah Seni Negara 2006 young talent category (dance choreography)

Jasabah organization
Throughout his experience in acquiring knowledge in Peninsular Malaysia, he felt that as a Sabah Bumiputera who was concerned about the situation of Sabahans in Peninsular Malaysia, there are citizens that are very poor and in-need of help. With the initiative of several Sabahans, he has agreed to set up a non-profit Non-Governmental Organization (NGO) to defend the welfare of Sabahans in Peninsular Malaysia. This organization is called Jasabah. He is the founder and chairman of this organization along with other Sabahans who serve as volunteers.

Political Party
He became political candidate, former Division Head of StarSabah Petagas and head of Starsabah Kuala Lumpur Liaison Committee following the leader of Sabah State Legislative Assembly Datuk Dr. Jeffrey Kitingan the president of Homeland Solidarity Party. Serving in the party since October 2019 until Disember 2020.

References

External links
 https://www.thestar.com.my/news/education/2006/11/26/dancers-step-out/ 
 https://www.thestar.com.my/news/education/2003/06/15/new-wave-in-dance/ 
 http://www.rogueart.asia/ra/tag/shafirul-azmi-suhaimi/ 
 Spring In Kuala Lumpur by Japan Foundation Kuala Lumpur 
 Best Group Performance. ASWARA Dancers for “Tapak 4” in Jamu 2009 – choreographed by Shafirul Azmi Suhaimi, presented by ASWARA 
 Bachelor of Dance with Honours (Choreography) MQR 

1980 births
Living people
Welfare in Malaysia
Malaysian choreographers